Two ships of the Royal Australian Navy (RAN) have been named HMAS Bunbury, for the port city of Bunbury, Western Australia.

 , a Bathurst-class corvette launched in 1942 and decommissioned in 1946
 , a Fremantle-class patrol boat which entered service in 1983 and left service in 2005

Battle honours
Two battle honours have been awarded to ships named HMAS Bunbury:
Pacific 1943–45
New Guinea 1943–44

References

Royal Australian Navy ship names